John Oates (1793–1831) was an English architect born in Salterhebble, near Halifax, West Yorkshire. He was noted in Manchester in 1813, and it is thought that this is where he trained.

He was responsible for several churches and other buildings in Huddersfield and the surrounding areas, including All Saints church at Paddock where he was interred upon his death in 1831.

The inscription upon his headstone reads:

 Here lie the remains of John Oates of Springwood, Architect, who died 16 May 1831 in the 37th year of his age.

 In private life he was a kind husband an affectionate father and a sincere friend.

 Under his superintendence the Infirmary and St Paul's Church, Huddersfield and this adjoining church were built.

Buildings include:

St Paul's church, Shipley, 1825; St John's church, Bishop Thornton, 1825 (partly demolished); Lockwood Spa Baths, 1827; Huddersfield Infirmary, 1829; Holy Trinity church, Idle, 1830; Former All Saints Church, Paddock, 1830; Christ Church, High Harrogate, 1831, St Paul's Church, Huddersfield, 1831.

References 

 http://homepage.eircom.net/~lawedd/ARCHITECTS.htm  Retrieved 1 December 2007
 A Biographical Dictionary of British Architects, 1600–1840 3rd Ed, H. Colvin; Yale University Press 1995

1793 births
1831 deaths
19th-century English architects
People from Halifax, West Yorkshire
English ecclesiastical architects
Architects from Yorkshire